Buhmann  is a surname. Notable people with the surname include:

 Bernhard Buhmann (born 1979), Austrian painter
 Rainer Buhmann (born 1981), German chess grandmaster
 Stephanie Buhmann (born 1977), German art critic, art historian, and curator

See also
 Bumann
 Burmann